Maculauger cinctellus is a species of sea snail, a marine gastropod mollusk in the family Terebridae, the auger snails.

References

External links
  (2020). Phylogenetic classification of the family Terebridae (Neogastropoda: Conoidea). Journal of Molluscan Studies

Terebridae
Gastropods described in 1859